Tordillo Partido is a partido of Buenos Aires Province in Argentina.

References

External links

 

1865 establishments in Argentina
Partidos of Buenos Aires Province